In linguistics, a simulfix is a type of affix that changes one or more existing phonemes (usually vowels) in order to modify the meaning of a morpheme.

Examples of simulfixes in English are generally considered irregularities, surviving results of Germanic umlaut. They include:

man → men, woman → women
louse → lice, mouse → mice
foot → feet, tooth → teeth

The transfixes of the Semitic languages may be considered a form of discontinuous simulfix.

In Indonesian, simulfixation productively occurs, for example, in ngopi, nyapu, nyuci, nongkrong and macul, which are verbs derived from the noun bases kopi, sapu, cuci, tongkrong and pacul.

See also 
Apophony

Affixes

References